Craig Murch (born 27 June 1993) is an English athlete specialising in the Hammer throw.

He became British champion when winning the hammer throw event at the 2020 British Athletics Championships with a throw of 73.24 metres.

References

Living people
1993 births
English male hammer throwers
British male hammer throwers
British Athletics Championships winners